Tarnow may refer to:

Places
Tarnow, Germany, a municipality in the Rostock district, in Mecklenburg-Vorpommern
Tarnów, a town in Lesser Poland Voivodeship, south Poland
Tarnów County, Lesser Poland Voivodeship
Tarnów Voivodeship, a former administrative unit in Poland, now part of the Lesser Poland Voivodeship
Tarnów, Lower Silesian Voivodeship, south-west Poland
Tarnów, Lublin Voivodeship, east Poland
Tarnów, Masovian Voivodeship, east-central Poland
Tarnów, Opole Voivodeship, south-west Poland
Tarnów, Gorzów County in Lubusz Voivodeship, west Poland
Tarnów, Żary County in Lubusz Voivodeship, west Poland

People with the surname
 Arthur Tarnow (1942-2022), United States District Court judge
 Dennis P. Tarnow, American dentist and authority on implant dentistry
 Fanny Tarnow (1779–1862), German writer
 Fritz Tarnow (1880–1951), German politician
 Rudolf Tarnow (1867–1933), Low German writer
 Toby Tarnow (born 1937), Canadian actress

Other uses
Unia Tarnów (sports club), based in Tarnów, Lesser Poland Voivodeship

See also
 Fürstenberg/Havel, a town in the Oberhavel district, Brandenburg, Germany formerly called Tarnow or Tornow
 Battle of Tornow, fought in 1758 near modern-day Fürstenberg/Havel between the forces of Prussia and Sweden during the Seven Years' War
 Tarnov (disambiguation)
 Tarnowo (disambiguation)
 Tarnowski family
 Tarnowskie Góry
 Veliko Tarnovo